Cycloctenidae is a family of spiders first described by Eugène Simon in 1898.

Genera

, the World Spider Catalog accepts the following genera:

Cycloctenus L. Koch, 1878 — Australia, New Zealand
Galliena Simon, 1898 — Indonesia
Orepukia Forster & Wilton, 1973 — New Zealand
Pakeha Forster & Wilton, 1973 — New Zealand
Paravoca Forster & Wilton, 1973 — New Zealand
Plectophanes Bryant, 1935 — New Zealand
Toxopsiella Forster, 1964 — New Zealand
Uzakia Koçak & Kemal, 2008 — New Zealand

References

External links
 Image of a Cycloctenus species

 
Araneomorphae families